Star Health and Allied Insurance Co Ltd is an Indian multinational health insurance company headquartered in Chennai. The company provides services in health, personal accident and overseas travel insurance, directly as well as through various channels like agents, brokers and online. Star Health is also prominently into bancassurance having long standing relationship with various banks.

Operations 
Currently Star Health has 12800+ employees and 640+ branch offices all over India.

Initial public offering 
Star Health Insurance launched its  initial public offering (IPO) in December 2021.

Financials 
Star Health has underwritten a gross written premium of Rs.6865 Cr during the FY 2019-20 and has built up a promising path with an appreciable net worth of Rs.1889 Cr, as on 31 March 2020.

As of 2021, it reported a total revenue of Rs.5446.82 with a loss of Rs.825.59 crores.

References

External links
 

Financial services companies based in Chennai
Multinational joint-venture companies
Financial services companies established in 1998
Health insurance companies of India
Indian companies established in 1998
2006 establishments in Tamil Nadu
Companies listed on the National Stock Exchange of India
Companies listed on the Bombay Stock Exchange